Brigadier General Douglas Gordon Cunningham,  (22 March 1908 – 18 July 1992) was a Canadian lawyer and soldier.

Early life
Cunningham was born in Kingston, Ontario. He was the son of Arthur Breden Cunningham and Kathleen (Gordon) Cunningham of Kingston. He was educated at Kingston Collegiate, Upper Canada College in Toronto, Ontario. He graduated from the Royal Military College of Canada in Kingston, Ontario in 1929. He studied at Osgoode Law School, University of Toronto,  from 1930 to 1933, where he was a member of The Kappa Alpha Society.

Career

In 1933, he was called to the Bar of Ontario and he had a law practice in Kingston, Ontario. In November 1939, he married Isabelle Simpson, daughter of Mr. and Mrs. Huntington Simpson of Kingston. They had two sons and a daughter; John Douglas Cunningham, Ian Simpson, and Kathleen Elizabeth. In 1939, he also became an alderman of the City of Kingston. He served as adjutant of The Princess of Wales' Own Regiment. He was brigade major of a Canadian infantry brigade which took part in the Dieppe Raid in 1942. He served as General Service Officer 1, I Canadian Corps in 1943. At the beginning of World War II, Captain Cunningham commanded the Camerons of Canada and as brigadier, commanded the 9th Canadian Infantry Brigade in 1944, landing on Juno Beach on D-Day. Described as “extraordinarily bright...meticulous” he was awarded the Distinguished Service Order for gallantry and distinguished services in the field of battle. He was also recognized by France with the Legion of Honour and the Croix de Guerre avec Palme. He returned to the Royal Military College of Canada as Commandant in 1944-5, but this was now a wartime training establishment. After retiring from the military in 1945, he returned to his law practice and he was a director of several companies. In 1946, he was part of a deputation which interviewed the Minister of National Defence about the proposal not to reopen the Royal Military College of Canada. He was a member of a subcommittee of the Royal Military College of Canada Club which urged the reopening of the college. He served as president of the Royal Military College of Canada Club of Canada in 1946. In 1946 he was created King's Counsel which later became Queen's Counsel (QC) when Elizabeth II ascended to the throne. He died on 18 July 1992.

References

4237 Dr. Adrian Preston & Peter Dennis (Edited) "Swords and Covenants" Rowman And Littlefield, London. Croom Helm. 1976.
H16511 Dr. Richard Arthur Preston "To Serve Canada: A History of the Royal Military College of Canada" 1997 Toronto, University of Toronto Press, 1969.
H16511 Dr. Richard Arthur Preston "Canada's RMC – A History of Royal Military College" Second Edition 1982
H1877 R. Guy C. Smith (editor) "As You Were! Ex-Cadets Remember". In 2 Volumes. Volume I: 1876–1918. Volume II: 1919–1984. Royal Military College. [Kingston]. The R.M.C. Club of Canada. 1984
 General Douglas Gordon Cunningham
 Generals of World War II

1908 births
1992 deaths
Canadian generals
Royal Military College of Canada alumni
Commandants of the Royal Military College of Canada
Canadian King's Counsel
Canadian Commanders of the Order of the British Empire
Canadian Companions of the Distinguished Service Order
Canadian Army personnel of World War II
Canadian military personnel from Ontario